Balacra diaphana is a moth of the family Erebidae. It was described by Sergius G. Kiriakoff in 1957. It is found in Uganda.

References

Endemic fauna of Uganda
Balacra
Moths described in 1957
Insects of Uganda
Erebid moths of Africa